Edward N. Gadsby  served as chairman of the U.S. Securities and Exchange Commission between 1957 and 1961.

Further reading
Guide to the Papers of Edward N. Gadsby: 1956-1973 New York University Archives
SEC News Digest August 20, 1957

Members of the U.S. Securities and Exchange Commission
1900 births
1973 deaths
Eisenhower administration personnel
Kennedy administration personnel